The A5 is a national road in Latvia which is part beltway around Riga, connecting Salaspils to Babīte. The road is also known as Riga bypass. The road is part of European route E67, European route E77 and Latvian TEN-T road network. The length of A5 is 41 kilometer. Currently A5 has 1x1 lanes until interchange with A9 then it turns to 2x2 all the way until Babīte. Most of the traffic on A5 is made up by trucks. A5 crosses river Daugava on Riga HES, and the A5 part on the HES has been reconstructed in 2010/2011. Another part of A5 between A8 and A9 was reconstructed in 2011. There are plans to build a new bridge over Daugava opposite to the end of A4 (part of Riga bypass on other side of Daugava), in further future. Current speed limit is 90 km/h. The average AADT of A5 in 2016 was 12 482 cars per day.

Crossings

Major cities crossed
Salaspils
Ķekava
Mārupe
Pinķi
Rīga

Gallery

References

External links
Autoceļš A5 in Google Maps

A05